Street Réalité, full title Liga One Industry presente Kamikaz - Street Réalité is the debut studio album of Marseille-based French rapper Kamikaz released on 27 April 2015 on Liga One Industry / Musicast French record label following the release of Kamikaz' mixtape Le reflet de la rue. In the album, Kamikaz Sofiane has collaborations with other rap / urban acts like Lartiste, Malaa, Jul, Veazy the two latter also signed artists for Liga One Industry founded by Kalif Hardcore et Tota based on rappers in Southern France.

Track list
"Intro" (3:19)
"Street réalité" (3:35)
"Dans mes rêves" (feat. Jul) (4:20)
"Routine" (3:45)
"Tu veux nous teste" (feat. Veazy) (4:12)
"On a qu'une vie" (3:19)
"Attentat vocal" (3:26)
"Je t'en veux pas" (3:55)
"La rue m'a bercé" (feat. Lartiste) (4:04)
"Blindé" (4:30)
"Seul contre tous" (4:37)
"Tu n'étais pas là" (3:57)
"S'évader" (3:41)
"Le monde est malade" (3:33)
"Hendek y'a les condés" (feat. Malaa) (4:00)
"Aller aller" (4:04)
"J'ai perdu mon temps" (4:12)

Charts

References

2015 albums
French-language albums